Airport Hotel is a station on the Taoyuan Airport MRT located in Dayuan District, Taoyuan City, Taiwan. The station is located under the Novotel Taipei Taoyuan International Airport and opened for commercial service on 2 March 2017.

This underground station has one island platform and two tracks. Only Commuter trains stop at this station. It opened for trial service on 2 February 2017, and for commercial service 2 March 2017.

The station opened for commercial service on 2 March 2017 with the opening of the Taipei-Huanbei section of the Airport MRT.

In popular culture 
In 2016, it was the site where the subway bombing scenes were filmed for Taiwanese drama Wake Up 2, while the station was still under construction.

See also
 Taoyuan Metro

References

Railway stations opened in 2017
2017 establishments in Taiwan
Taoyuan Airport MRT stations